Loryma alluaudalis is a species of snout moth in the genus Loryma. It was described by Patrice J.A. Leraut in 2009 and is known from Tanzania (the type location is Mbuyumi).

References

Moths described in 2009
Pyralini
Moths of Africa